Barbara Siciliano  (born ) is a retired Italian female volleyball player. She was part of the Italy women's national volleyball team.

She participated in the 1994 FIVB Volleyball Women's World Championship. On club level she played with Anthesis Modena.

Clubs
 Anthesis Modena (1994)

References

1972 births
Living people
Italian women's volleyball players
Place of birth missing (living people)